The year 1917 in architecture involved some significant architectural events and new buildings.

Events
 The journal De Stijl is first published by Theo van Doesburg.

Buildings and structures

Buildings

 The Het Schip housing scheme designed by Michel de Klerk in Amsterdam is started.
 The Lister County Courthouse (Listers härads tingshus) designed by Erik Gunnar Asplund in a Mannerist style in Sölvesborg, Sweden is started.

Buildings completed
 Cunard Building, Liverpool, England, designed by William Edward Willink and Philip Coldwell Thicknesse.
 Edificio Correos, San José, Costa Rica
 Livermore House, San Francisco, California, USA, designed by Julia Morgan.
 Rhode Island Hospital Trust Building, Providence, Rhode Island, USA, designed by York and Sawyer

Awards
 RIBA Royal Gold Medal – Henri Paul Nenot.

Births

 March 2 – Laurie Baker, British-born Indian architect, known for his initiatives in cost-effective energy-efficient architecture (died 2007)
 April 26 – I. M. Pei, Chinese American architect often called a master of modern architecture (died 2019)
 July 6 – Wang Da-hong, Chinese-born Taiwanese architect (died 2018)
 September 14 – Ettore Sottsass, Italian architect and designer (died 2007)
 December 8 – Nisse Strinning, Swedish architect and designer (died 2006)
 December 10 – Eladio Dieste, Uruguayan engineer and architect (died 2000)

Deaths
 January 19 – E. R. Robson, English school architect (born 1836)
 February 8 – Thomas Arboe, Danish railway station architect (born 1837)
 July 2 – Gerald Horsley, English architect (born 1862)
 August 4 – C. W. Stephens, English commercial architect (born c.1845)
 September 23 – Robert Swain Peabody, Boston architect (born 1845)
 November 23 – William Ralph Emerson, American architect (born 1833)
 December 30 – Gustaf Nyström, Finnish architect (born 1856)

References